"Soul Kitchen" is a song by the Doors from their self-titled debut album The Doors. Singer Jim Morrison wrote the lyrics as a tribute to the soul food restaurant Olivia's in Venice Beach, California. Because he often stayed too late, the staff had to kick him out, thus the lines "let me sleep all night, in your soul kitchen".

Composition
The song is notated in the key of A Major with Jim Morrison's vocal range spanning from E4 to A5. It has a Dorian alternation of i and IV. Like the other songs from their debut album, the songwriting credit was given to each members of the Doors; the performance rights organization ASCAP list the song as a group composition.

Despite the songwriting credit, its lyrics were written by Morrison during the summer of 1965. Guitarist Robby Krieger acknowledged soul-singer James Brown's influence on the song, stating that he wanted to simulate a horn section by Brown, with the riff heard throughout. Music journalist Stephen Davis characterized it as a hard rock track, while Gillian G. Gaar called it "funky blues-rock".

Critical reception
Sal Cinquemani of Slant Magazine declared "Soul Kitchen" as a "classic Doors song".
According to rock critic Greil Marcus, "Soul Kitchen" is the Doors' version of "Gloria" by Van Morrison, a song the Doors often covered in their early days. Marcus writes, "It was a staircase—not, as with 'Gloria' in imagery, but in the cadence the two songs shared, slowed down so strongly in 'Soul Kitchen' that a sense of deliberation, so physical that it was more body than thought, became the guiding spirit of the song."

In a 1967 article in Crawdaddy! magazine, Paul Williams compared it to "Blowin' in the Wind" since both songs had a message, with the message of "Soul Kitchen" being "Learn to forget." He praised the song: "The End" is "great to listen to when you're high (or any other time)", but "Soul Kitchen" "will get you high, which is obviously much cruder and more important."

AllMusic critic Richie Unterberger praised the song's "stomping rock". On June 24, 2021, The Guardian published a list with "The Doors greatest songs", in which "Soul Kitchen" was placed as the sixth.

Personnel
There has been some discrepancy at who contributed the bass: Doors' engineer Bruce Botnick recalled that after the song's recording, session musician Larry Knechtel was brought in to overdub bass; but guitarist Robby Krieger insisted that he played the bass guitar.

The Doors
 Jim Morrison – vocals
 Ray Manzarek – organ, keyboard bass
 Robby Krieger – guitar, bass guitar
 John Densmore – drums

Additional musicians
 Larry Knechtel – bass guitar

References

1967 songs
The Doors songs
American psychedelic rock songs
Songs about Los Angeles
Songs written by John Densmore
Songs written by Robby Krieger
Songs written by Ray Manzarek
Songs written by Jim Morrison
Song recordings produced by Paul A. Rothchild